Oceanside School District is a school district in Oceanside, New York. There are 854 full-time employees, of which 440 are teachers.

Schools
Florence A. Smith Elementary School
Oaks Elementary School
South Oceanside Road Elementary School
North Oceanside Road Elementary School
Pre-K & Kindergarten Program
Fulton Avenue Elementary School
Walter S. Boardman Elementary School
Oceanside Middle School
Oceanside High School (New York)
Oceanside High School Castleton

See also
List of school districts in New York

References

External links

School districts in New York (state)
Education in Nassau County, New York